Euphorbia hispida is a species of flowering plant in the family Euphorbiaceae, native to Afghanistan, Bangladesh, India, Iran, Kuwait, Pakistan and Western Himalaya. It was first described by Pierre Edmond Boissier in 1860.

References

hispida
Flora of Afghanistan
Flora of Bangladesh
Flora of India
Flora of Iran
Flora of Kuwait
Flora of Pakistan
Flora of West Himalaya
Plants described in 1860
Taxa named by Pierre Edmond Boissier